Judge Edward Aaron (born 1923) was an African American handyman in Birmingham, Alabama who was abducted by seven members of  Asa Earl Carter's independent Ku Klux Klan group on Labor Day, September 2, 1957.

Background
Aaron, who was mildly developmentally disabled, was abducted by Klan members who beat him with an iron bar, carved the letters "KKK" into his chest, castrated him with a razor, and poured turpentine on his wounds. They then put him in the trunk of a car and drove him away from the scene, finally dumping him near a creek. Police found Aaron, near death from blood loss, and took him to Hillman Hospital. 

Two of the six Klansmen turned state's evidence and received five-year sentences in exchange for testifying against the other four men. Those four were convicted and received 20-year sentences at Kilby Prison. However, when George Wallace became governor of Alabama, he pardoned the four convicted men, but not the two who had turned state's evidence, with no explanation.

The 1988 film Mississippi Burning references the story of Judge Aaron, but gives his name as Homer Wilkes. He was interviewed about the abduction and attack in 1965.

See also
List of kidnappings

Notes

1923 births
20th-century African-American people
American torture victims
Castrated people
Formerly missing people
Kidnapped American people
Ku Klux Klan crimes in Alabama
Possibly living people
Racially motivated violence against African Americans